Anselm Franz, 2nd Prince of Thurn and Taxis, full German name: Anselm Franz Fürst von Thurn und Taxis (30 January 1681 – 8 November 1739) was the second Prince of Thurn and Taxis, Postmaster General of the Imperial Reichspost, and Head of the House of Thurn and Taxis from 21 February 1714 until his death on 8 November 1739.

Early life
Anselm Franz was the eldest child and son of Eugen Alexander Franz, 1st Prince of Thurn and Taxis and his wife Princess Anna Adelheid of Fürstenberg-Heiligenberg. The date of his birth is unknown, but Anselm Franz was baptised on 30 January 1681 at the Our Blessed Lady of Zavel Church in Brussels.

Postmaster General

Under his father, at the beginning of the War of the Spanish Succession the administration of the Imperial Reichspost was moved from Brussels to Frankfurt am Main. When his father died, Anselm Franz was appointed Postmaster General by Charles VI in 1715, and returned to the family's home in Brussels, but the city now had no significance for the Reichspost. He therefore moved back to Frankfurt am Main in 1724, where he bought a plot of land on which he later started construction of the Baroque Palais Thurn und Taxis in 1729. In 1725, he was able to lease the postal system of the Austrian Netherlands as a Habsburg fief. His move to Frankfurt was drawn out over several years, as the city council had some objections and in any case the construction of his palace took its time. From 1737 he lived in the still unfinished palace in Frankfurt, but then returned in 1739 to Brussels, where he died unexpectedly.

Marriages and family
Anselm Franz married Czech noblewoman Princess Maria Ludovika Anna Franziska of Lobkowicz, daughter of Ferdinand August Leopold, Prince of Lobkowicz, Duke of Sagan and his wife Margravine Maria Anna Wilhelmine of Baden-Baden, on 10 January 1703. Franz Anselm and Maria Ludovika had four children:

Alexander Ferdinand, 3rd Prince of Thurn and Taxis (1704–1773)
Princess Philippine Eleonore Maria of Thurn and Taxis (1705–1706)
Princess Maria Augusta of Thurn and Taxis (1706–1756)
Prince Christian Adam Egon of Thurn and Taxis (1710–1745)

Legacy in telecom industry
Anselm Franz von Thurn und Taxis had connections with the French Postmaster  who was based in the Paris Hôtel de Villeroy. While the network of the Thurn & Taxis Imperial Post covered the Habsburg territories, they did not have access to the one of the Bourbons. Louis Leon Pajot was the head of the Pajot & Rouillé postal operations with a strong infrastructure in the French Bourbon territories. Pajot was a confidant of King Louis XIV who appreciated the efficiency of the Pajot & Rouillé postal service. Louis XIV died in 1715.

On May 21, 1738, a decision of the next Bourbon King Louis XV and his minister of finance, Cardinal Fleury brought a sudden and unexpected end to the French Postal Company. In the early morning of the day Police interrupted all activities. The sudden end of the Pajot & Rouillé Post very much impressed Anselm Franz von Thurn & Taxis, as he did not want the same happen to the Thurn & Taxis postal operations.

The story was transmitted from one generation to another. In 1867, 129 years later, the State of Prussia brought an end to the Thurn & Taxis Post, but unlike Louis XV, a significant compensation payment of 3.000.000 Thaler had to be made.

In 1952 Johannes, 11th Prince of Thurn and Taxis inherited what was left from the Postal fortune.
1986, mai he was in Paris
and showed the still existing Postal Building to a young student.

The idea came up to relaunch some Telecom activities in the old building
which was almost unchanged since the times of the Postal Services.
His families former postal headquarters, 
the Palais Tour et Taxis in Brussels and the Frankfurt Palais Thurn und Taxis had been destroyed.

According to Johannes von Thurn & Taxis "Spirit of Telecommunications had remained in the old walls"
of the 9-11 rue des Déchargeurs mansion in Paris.

With the help of Thurn und Taxis
the student opened a small Phone Boutique as a "test project",
today Cremerie de Paris N°2 
a few meters away from the Hôtel de Villeroy Bourbon.
... 249 years after the end of the postal operations.
Johannes von Thurn und Taxis watched the "test" but he died very early 1990, December 14.

With the 1993 arrival of the Internet 
the "test" project 
turned into a global Internet Directory Publishing company 
and the Brand Museum Cremerie de Paris based in the historic building.

Attracted by the unusual Telecom history 
major Technology Corporations like Amazon  
or Microsoft  
are now coming to organise brand expos or product launches.

As a reminder of PTT history, 
Anselm Franz von Thurn und Taxis his Posthorn and the Eiffel Tower
are part of the Logo of the Whitepages of over 50 different countries,
all edited from the old Postal Building in Paris.

Honours
Knight of the Austrian Order of the Golden Fleece

Ancestry

References

Sources
 
 
 Europäische Stammtafeln Band V

! colspan="3" style="background: #bebebe; color: #000000" | Postal offices

1681 births
1739 deaths
Nobility from Brussels
German Roman Catholics
Princes of Thurn und Taxis
German landowners
Knights of the Golden Fleece of Austria
Postmasters General of the Holy Roman Empire
Hereditary Princes of Thurn and Taxis